Crimson snapper is a common name for a number of fish:

 Pristipomoides filamentosus, more commonly known as the crimson jobfish
 Lutjanus erythropterus